Bola de Prata (Portuguese for Silver Ball) may refer to:

 Bola de Prata (Brazil), an annual award given by Placar magazine to the best Série A players from each position
 Bola de Prata (Portugal), a Primeira Liga award for the league top scorer